The 39th National Hockey League All-Star Game was held in the St. Louis Arena in St. Louis, home to the St. Louis Blues, on February 9, 1988.

Lemieux makes his mark
Pittsburgh Penguins' centremen Mario Lemieux recorded six points (3–3–6) and scored the game-winner in overtime to lead the Wales Conference to a thrilling 6–5 victory.  Lemieux's six points broke the previous record for most points in an All-Star Game, which was previously held by six players (four points).  Montreal Canadiens' leftwinger Mats Naslund earned an assist on all three of Lemieux's goals and added two more to set an All-Star Game record with five assists.

Uniforms
The NHL returned to the All-Star uniform design worn before Rendez-vous '87 but replaced the conference names on the front with the NHL shield. A patch featuring the logo of the All-Star Game replaced the smaller NHL shield on the left shoulder. In addition, the block shadow typeface for the names and numerals was replaced with simple black letters and numbers, except for on the black sleeve sections of the orange jersey worn by the Wales team, where the numbers were white instead.

Team rosters

Game summary

Referee: Denis Morel
Linesmen: Kevin Collins, Randy Mitton
TV: CBC, SRC, ESPN

Notes

Bob Plager's brother, Barclay Plager, was also named honorary captain, but he died three days before the All-Star Game from a brain hemorrhage due to a brain tumour, on February 6. A moment of silence in his honor occurred before the start of the game.
Doug Wilson was unable to start the game and was replaced by Al MacInnis in the starting lineup.

See also
 1987–88 NHL season

All-Star Game
National Hockey League All-Star Games
Ice hockey competitions in St. Louis
1980s in St. Louis
National Hockey League All-Star Game
National Hockey League All-Star Game